Byrsonima lucida is a species of plant in the Malpighiaceae family. It is endemic to islands in the Caribbean and to the U.S. state of Florida. It is a shrub or small tree, and produces pink flowers. Its natural habitat is hammocks in dry limestone rocklands, and in sandy pine-palm woods.

Common names for the plant include clam cherry, gooseberry, locust berry and Long Key locustberry.

References

lucida
Flora of the Caribbean
Flora of Florida
Flora of Puerto Rico
Taxa named by Augustin Pyramus de Candolle
Flora without expected TNC conservation status